Eugenio Tomás La Rosa Laguna (born 20 December 1962) is a retired Peruvian international footballer who played for Alianza Lima and clubs in Argentina and Ecuador.

Career
Born in Lima, Peru, La Rosa played for local giants Alianza Lima before moving abroad to play in Argentina and Ecuador. La Rosa made 15 appearances, scoring three goals, for the Peru national football team from 1984 to 1991. He participated in the 1991 Copa América.

References

External links

1962 births
Living people
Footballers from Lima
Association football forwards
Peruvian footballers
Peru international footballers
1987 Copa América players
1991 Copa América players
Peruvian Primera División players
Club Alianza Lima footballers
Argentinos Juniors footballers
S.D. Quito footballers
Sporting Cristal footballers
Deportivo Municipal footballers
Peruvian expatriate footballers
Expatriate footballers in Argentina
Expatriate footballers in Ecuador